Rowena Mary Bruce (15 May 1919 – 24 September 1999), née Dew, was an English chess player who held the title of Woman International Master (WIM, 1951). She was an eleven-time winner of the British Women's Chess Championship (1937, 1950, 1951, 1954, 1955, 1959, 1960, 1962, 1963, 1967 and 1969). She has won the tournament the most.

Biography
From the end of the 1930s to the end of the 1960s, she was one of England's strongest and most well-known female chess players. In 1935, she won the FIDE World Girls Championship. Rowena Mary Bruce won the British Women's Chess Championship eleven times: 1937, 1950, 1951, 1954, 1955, 1959, 1960, 1962, 1963, 1967 and 1969 (both last times shared 1st place with Dinah Margaret Norman). In 1952, in Moscow, she participated in the Women's Candidates Tournament where she took 12th place. In 1951, she was awarded the FIDE Woman International Master (WIM) title.

On 21 June 1946, Bruce played (and lost) a "radio chess" match against Lyudmila Rudenko. Bruce was one of two women who were part of a twelve-member British team who played in a four-day tournament. The British team played their moves in London while the Russian team played their moves in Moscow.

Rowena Mary Bruce played for England in the Women's Chess Olympiads:
 In 1966, at second board in the 3rd Chess Olympiad (women) in Oberhausen (+5, =5, -2) where she won an individual silver medal, and
 In 1969, at second board in the 4th Chess Olympiad (women) in Lublin (+5, =3, -6).

In 1940, she married Ronald Bruce, and the two were married until his death in 1991.

Death
Following a series of small strokes, she died at the age of 80 in 1999.

References

External links

Rowena Mary Bruce chess games at 365Chess.com

1919 births
1999 deaths
Sportspeople from Plymouth, Devon
English female chess players
Chess Woman International Masters
Chess Olympiad competitors
20th-century chess players